Livno is a city and the administrative center of Canton 10 of the Federation of Bosnia and Herzegovina, an entity of Bosnia and Herzegovina. It is situated on the river Bistrica in the southeastern edge of the Livno Field at the foot of Kruzi plateau which are located beneath the Cincar mountain and rocky hill Crvenice. Livno is the centre of the Canton 10 which mainly covers an area of the historical and geographical region of Tropolje. As of 2013, it has a population of 37,487 inhabitants.

The town, with its historic ruins and old town from the 9th century, was first mentioned in 892, developing at the crossroads between the Adriatic coast and inland, i.e., regions of Bosnia, Dalmatia, Herzegovina, and Krajina.

History
The plains of Livno have been populated since approximately 2000 BC. In the late Bronze Age, the Neolithic population was replaced by more Indo-European tribes known as the Illyrians. The region was inhabited by Illyrian tribe of Dalmatae which capital was Delminium in today's Tomislavgrad. They left remains that testify about their presence in this area. The most important of them are the gradine, remains of Illyrian settlements which were distributed along the Livno Field. The three most important are Velika gradina, Mala gradina and Kasalov gradac.

After the Roman conquest of the area, it was part of the province of Dalmatia. During the twenties of the first century AD, Roman government built a road connecting Salona, a city on the coast with Servitium, a city at the peripanonic lowlands. Its route passed through the Livno Field where two road stations have been established. The station of Pelva was located at the area of village Lištani and in the area of Livno station Bariduo was based.

Livno celebrates its founding date as 28 September 892 AD, being mentioned in a document from Duke Mutimir which was released at that time. It was the centre of Hlebiana (ή Χλεβίανα) županija (province) of the Kingdom of Croatia, as mentioned in the tenth century work De Administrando Imperio (chapter 30). From 1199 Emeric until 1326 Mladen II Šubić of Bribir, who was a resident of Livno, it was part of the Chelmensis territory. From 1326 until 1463 Livno was part of the Bosnian Kingdom. One of the noble families of the Bosnian Kingdom bought Livno, Duvno, and Kupres (12th to 13th century) then called "Tropolje," (Three Fields).

The beginning of 15th century saw the Ottoman Empire advance, invade, and occupy Bosnia for the next 400 years. Mosque complex in the picture (left) the Hajji Ahmed the Ducat Minter's Mosque (more commonly known as the Glavica ("Head") Mosque, called after the knap above town on which it is erected) Constructed upon design by Mimar Sinan in 1574. (some date to 1587), it is situated on a hill overlooking the old town of Livno, the river Bistrica and the spring Duman in the upper section of the old town of Livno. The mosque complex consists of a compact main building of the mosque under a dome and uncharacteristically short minaret, with a clock tower which was erected around 1659, and is still in use today. Within the perimeter is an almost 500-year-old necropolis with characteristic early Bosnian Muslim tombstones and later ones.

In 1878, Livno was occupied by Austro-Hungarian forces. Soldiers from Dalmatia and an infantry division from Osijek fiercely fought against 3,000 Ottoman and Muslim militias around Livno, finally capturing the town on September 27. The Congress of Berlin approved of Austro-Hungarian rule in Bosnia and Herzegovina that year.

From 1918 it was part of the Kingdom of Serbs, Croats and Slovenes. In 1929 the kingdom was renamed the Kingdom of Yugoslavia and divided into nine banates (banovine). Livno was divided into the Littoral Banovina, with its centre in the city of Split. This division brought Livno politically closer to Croatia. In 1939, the banates were further redrawn so that there was a Croatian banate (Banovina Hrvatska) of which Livno was also part.

From 1941–45, Livno was part of the Axis Independent State of Croatia, and was labeled as a pro-Ustaše region. The territory that partisans liberated and managed to keep under their control from November 1942 to January 1943 (dubbed the Republic of Bihać) included all of rural Western Herzegovina west of Neretva and Široki Brijeg, including Livno. Livno and its area, under partisan control from August to October 1942, was very important for partisan resistance, as key Croatian Peasant Party members from Livno Florijan Sučić and Ivan Pelivan joined the partisans resistance and mobilized many other Croats. Croatian writer Ivan Goran Kovačić joined the Partisans in Croata, writing his epic poem "Jama" ("The Pit") during his time with the resistance. He finished it in Livno. When Croatian Ustaše forces drove  the partisans out of Livno in October 1942.

After the end of World War II, Livno was a part of Socialist Republic of Bosnia and Herzegovina in Yugoslavia. After its collapse in 1991 and during the Bosnian War, it was under control of Croat Republic of Herzeg-Bosnia.

The Washington Agreement saw to the end of Herzeg-Bosnia, and Livno became a part of the Federation of Bosnia and Herzegovina.

Location
Livno is 96 km from Split, 127 km  from Mostar, 167 km from Banja Luka and 212 km  from Sarajevo and 487 km from old capital Belgrade.

Settlements
• Bila
• Bilo Polje
• Bogdaše
• Bojmunte
• Čaić
• Čaprazlije
• Čelebić
• Čuklić
• Ćosanlije
• Dobro
• Donji Rujani
• Drinova Međa
• Držanlije
• Golinjevo
• Gornji Rujani
• Grborezi
• Grgurići
• Gubin
• Komorani
• Kovačić
• Lipa
• Lištani
• Livno
• Lopatice
• Lopatinac
• Lusnić
• Ljubunčić
• Mali Guber
• Mali Kablići
• Miši
• Odžak
• Orguz
• Podgradina
• Podgreda
• Podhum
• Potkraj
• Potočani
• Potok
• Priluka
• Prisap
• Prolog
• Provo
• Radanovci
• Rapovine
• Sajković
• Smričani
• Srđevići
• Strupnić
• Suhača
• Tribić
• Veliki Guber
• Veliki Kablići
• Vidoši
• Vrbica
• Vržerala
• Zabrišće
• Zagoričani
• Zastinje
• Žabljak
• Žirović

Demographics

Population

Ethnic composition

Geography

Livno is both the cultural and industrial center of the canton. It is the biggest city in the canton and situated 730 meters above sea level. Livno is also situated in the Livanjsko field which is the largest field in the entire country. The field is situated between the mountains Dinara and Kamešnica in the south, Tušnica in the east, Cincar in the north and Šator in the west.

Climate
Livno has a stable continental climate with cold winters and warm summers. It is situated between the mountains Cincar and Kamesnica which make the climate more continental than the climate in Mostar and Čapljina for example. The winters in that part of the country are not as cold as in Livno.  Climate in this area has mild differences between highs and lows, and there is adequate rainfall year-round.  The Köppen Climate Classification subtype for this climate is "Cfb" (Marine West Coast Climate/Oceanic climate).

Governance
The main local government of the municipality is Municipal Council of Livno. Council has 31 members elected for a four-year term by proportional representation. Livno has its municipal mayor who is the highest-ranking officer in the municipal government.

Structure of the Council

Sport
Livno is home to many sport clubs, the most famous of which are Troglav 1918 football club, and MNK Seljak futsal club. Basketball is represented by KK Livno and ŽKK Livno.

Transport 
M16 road, passing through Kupres and Šujica, connects Livno with Croatia and Central Bosnia. M6.1 starts at Bosansko Grahovo, runs through Livno connecting it with Tomislavgrad, Herzegovina and Mostar. Going northwards M15 connects Livno with Glamoč and northern Bosnia and Herzegovina.

Notable people
 Zlatko Dalić, former football player, coach, Croatia national football team coach
 Gabrijel Jurkić (1886–1974), painter
 Filip Mihaljević, shot put and discus thrower
 Mate Rimac, entrepreneur, CEO of Rimac Automobili
 Mladen II Šubić of Bribir (c. 1270–c. 1341), Croatian leader and member of the Šubić family
 Almir Velagić, weightlifter, 2008 and 2012 Summer Olympics competitor, multiple European championships medalist (for Germany)

References

Notes

Books

External links 

Municipality of Livno website 
Livno Online 
Aero Club of Livno 
Osmrtnic Livno
Tourism Association of Bosnia-Herzegovina site about Livno

 
Populated places in Livno